The Hakodate Sprint Stakes (Japanese 函館スプリントステークス) is a Grade 3 horse race for Thoroughbreds aged three and over, run in June over a distance of 1200 metres on turf at Hakodate Racecourse.

It was first run in 1994 and has held Grade 3 status ever since. The race was run at Sapporo Racecourse until 1997.

Records
Record time:
 1:06.8 - Jeune Ecole 2017

Most successful horse:
 2 - Noble Grass 1995, 1996
 2 - She Is Tosho 2004, 2005

Most wins by a jockey:
 4 - Kenichi Ikezoe 2004, 2005, 2011, 2018

Most wins by a trainer:
 3 - Hiroyuki Uehara  1995, 1996, 2018
 3 - Takayuki Yasuda  2010, 2011, 2017

Winners since 1994

See also
 Horse racing in Japan
 List of Japanese flat horse races

References

Turf races in Japan